The 1899 Invercargill mayoral election was held on 29 November 1899 as part of that year's local elections. Voting booths were provided in each ward for the first time.

Incumbent mayor John Stead was defeated by councillor James Smith Goldie.

Results
The following table gives the election results:

References

1899 elections in New Zealand
Mayoral elections in Invercargill